Riffi Mandanda (born 11 October 1992) is a professional footballer who plays as a goalkeeper. Born in France, he is a former youth international for France and DR Congo.

Club career
Mandanda is a youth product of Caen, though he was never offered a spot in the club's first team. After making his debut in the French lower divisions on loans, Mandanda joined Ajaccio in 2015, as a backup for Anthony Scribe. He made his full professional debut a few months later, in a 3–0 Ligue 2 defeat against Nancy.

In February 2020, Mandanda joined Rennes on a contract until the end of the 2019–20 season. He left the club at the expiration of his contract in summer 2020.

On 7 September 2020, Mandanda signed with Norwegian club Kongsvinger IL that plays in the second tier 1. divisjon. In July 2021, he joined Créteil in the Championnat National.

International career
Mandanda played five matches with the France U18 team and one with the France U19 before playing four matches with Congo DR under-20. In November 2019 he was called up by the DR Congo national team, but did not make the team's roster for 2021 Africa Cup of Nations qualifiers.

Personal life
Mandanda is the younger brother of France international goalkeeper Steve Mandanda and DR Congo international goalkeeper Parfait Mandanda. His younger brother Over Mandanda signed with Ligue 1 club Bordeaux in July 2017.

References

External links
 
 
 
 
 Riffi Mandanda at the Foot-National.com

1992 births
Living people
Footballers from Le Havre
French sportspeople of Democratic Republic of the Congo descent
Association football goalkeepers
French footballers
Democratic Republic of the Congo footballers
Ligue 2 players
Championnat National players
Championnat National 2 players
Championnat National 3 players
Norwegian First Division players
Stade Malherbe Caen players
Tarbes Pyrénées Football players
Vendée Poiré-sur-Vie Football players
AFC Compiègne players
ES Uzès Pont du Gard players
AC Ajaccio players
US Boulogne players
Stade Rennais F.C. players
Kongsvinger IL Toppfotball players
US Créteil-Lusitanos players
French expatriate footballers
Democratic Republic of the Congo expatriate footballers
Expatriate footballers in Norway
French expatriate sportspeople in Norway
Democratic Republic of the Congo expatriate sportspeople in Norway
Black French sportspeople